Don Dixon (born December 13, 1950) is an American record producer, songwriter, and musician. He is considered to be one of the key producers of what is called the jangle pop movement of the early 1980s, including working with R.E.M. and The Smithereens.

Early life
Dixon was born in Lancaster, South Carolina.  He says he learned to play the bass guitar in junior high school  "because of the control that it offered". He said, "I bought a bass, one of those great Danelectro Silvertones, and I wish I had it back. From Sears for $79. Then a few months later I really liked upright, so I found an old upright in a church in Charlotte, and just was sort of self-taught on those things, but I could read music." At the age of fifteen, he made his first recording, playing upright bass with jazz musician Louis McGloughn in Charlotte, North Carolina. He also sang in church. 

Dixon attended the University of North Carolina at Chapel Hill, where his roommate was the writer Bruce Brooks.

Career

Arrogance 

Dixon and several fellow freshmen at the University of North Carolina at Chapel Hill formed the band Arrogance. He shared lead vocals, played the bass, and also wrote songs. Arrogance recorded six albums and helped create a local music scene. Before breaking up in 1983, Arrogance became North Carolina's top local act. Dixon spent thirteen years as a member of Arrogance and learned the essence of record production during this time, producing all of the band's independent albums. He says, "Even though Arrogance never made it big nationally, we did play all over the eastern part of the country and we did release six albums. In fact, we really did help pioneer the independent approach to putting out albums in the '70s. …We took it upon ourselves to play original music in clubs, to force club owners and audiences to realize that new music doesn't have to come from someplace else."

Producer 
Dixon was still playing with Arrogance in 1982 when Mitch Easter asked him to co-produce R.E.M.'s debut LP Murmur and their 1984 follow–up LP Reckoning. Dixon and Easter are credited in the Reckoning liner notes as "Machinists". Dixon says, "We thought R.E.M. had a neat, unique thing, and we wanted to protect it and allow it to grow without putting it in that pressure to sell as many records as possible. We didn't feel we had to change their arrangements that much, because they were eccentric enough already. We did add an underpinning, a substrata to hold it together and make it sound like something more than just another guitar, bass and drums band. There's all kinds of found art on those records: slowed-down tapes of them playing pool, noises coming in and out, additional guitars. It's not like we sat around and talked about it for months; we did it as we did it, which is still my approach to producing."

Dixon then spent several years producing artists such as Chris Stamey (formerly of The dB's), The Smithereens, Fetchin Bones, Richard Barone (formerly of The Bongos), Guadalcanal Diary, and Marshall Crenshaw. Tommy Keene's Run Now EP is considered to be a highlight of this era of Dixon's work.

Dixon met with Nirvana as a potential producer for Nevermind. According to Dixon, both the label and the band were agreeable to the collaboration. Dixon said, "I loved these demos that he [Gary Gersh of Geffen Records] sent me and I flew out days after I got my first cassette. They still didn’t have words for ‘Smells Like Teen Spirit.’ ‘Lithium’ was done and it was almost exactly like it is on the record. They sent me four or five songs, I loved them and I thought it was great. So I went out and spent some time in Tacoma. It looked like it was going to happen and then I asked for too much money—well, me and my people did." However, Dixon concludes, “I was really sad that I didn’t get to make the record, because I liked those songs, but I think Butch [Vig] probably made a better record than I would have. I wouldn’t have made him doubletrack his voice."

Working with Easter at Fidelitorium Recordings in Kernersville, North Carolina, Dixon produced Mixed Reality, the sixth studio album by American alternative rock band Gin Blossoms. It was released on June 15, 2018, on Cleopatra Records.

Solo artist 
Dixon became a solo performer in 1983. In 1985, success as a producer led to Dixon's solo debut Most of the Girls Like to Dance But Only Some of the Boys Like To, a collection of early demos. This album reflected his love of classic pop melodies and spiky, Nick Lowe-inspired word play. In 1987, Dixon recorded Romeo at Juilliard described as Big Star–style power pop. Chi-Town Budget Show (1988) was a recording of a Chicago's Park West nightclub broadcast. In 1989, his album EEE featured the Uptown Horns.

In 1992 Restless Records released a Don Dixon "Best Of" album entitled (If) I'm A Ham, Well You're A Sausage. In 1995, after taking time off to raise a family, Dixon released Romantic Depressive, a somewhat darker–themed album. In 1996, he produced the original cast recording of King Mackerel & The Blues Are Running (Songs And Stories of the Carolina Coast) which featured Bland Simpson (Red Clay Ramblers) and author/composer Jim Wann.

After four years, he released The Invisible Man (2000), an album about mortality, with songs from the viewpoints of people of various ages. Note Pad #38 in 2001 was an odds–and–ends collection of unreleased material from his solo career. In 2006, he released The Entire Combustible World in One Small Room, a concept album revolving around rooms in a house. In 2014, Dixon released High & Filthy & Borderline, based on the lives of a male and a female assassin.

Collaborations 
Dixon and wife Marti Jones released the download-only album Lucky Stars: New Lullabies for Old Souls in 2008. A departure from their previous sound, this project began as a request from a friend who was putting together an album of lullabies to sell in hospitals to new parents. The album featured six songs with vocals and five instrumentals. 

Although Dixon and his wife Marti Jones have collaborated on each other's albums for years, in 2011 they released Living Stereo, their first proper duet album. On June 23rd, 2011, they played a five-song set together on NPR's Mountain Stage. Dixon says, "It's really a pleasure working with Marti because we have a lot of common sensibilities. When we get a nice creative thing going, it keeps on going without little stumbling blocks. It ends up being challenging without being frustrating."

In 2008, Dixon released The Nu-Look with The Jump Rabbits, his bandmates of more than 20 years: Jamie Hoover of The Spongetones and Jim Brock.

Around 2009, Dixon began playing bass with Mary Chapin Carpenter’s touring band.

Acting 
Dixon played an alcoholic composer in Todd Graff's 2003 film Camp.
Dixon appeared onstage in the musical King Mackerel & the Blues Are Running: Songs & Stories of the North Carolina Coast, co-created with Jim Wann (Pump Boys and Dinettes) and Bland Simpson (Red Clay Ramblers)

Publications 
In 2009, a book of his song lyrics, Songs 101: the Lyrics of Don Dixon, was published by VanZeno Press.

Personal life
While producing for A&M Records, Dixon met singer/artist Marti Jones who was from Uniontown, Ohio. Dixon said, "We became friends while working on her first album, Unsophisticated Time. Good platonic friends, not just professional friends. Later on, after that first record was released, I realized that I wanted to be with her all the time." They married in 1988. The couple have a daughter, Shane, in 1991. The family lives in Canton, Ohio.

Discography

Studio albums
 1985: Most of the Girls Like to Dance but Only Some of the Boys Like To (Enigma Records)
 1987: Romeo at Juilliard (Enigma Records)
 1989: EEE (Enigma Records)
 1995: Romantic Depressive (Sugar Hill Records)
 2000: The Invisible Man (Gadfly Records)
 2006: The Entire Combustible World in One Small Room (125 Records)
 2010: Don Dixon Sings the Jeffords Brothers (Arcade Records)
 2014: High & Filthy & Borderline (Dixon Archival Remnants Records)

Compilations 
 1992: (If) I'm a Ham, Well You're a Sausage (Restless Records)
 2001: Note Pad #38 (Dixon Archival Remnants Records)

Live album
 1988: Chi-Town Budget Show (Restless Records)

Arrogance 

 1973: Give Us a Break (Reflection Sound Studio)
 1975: Prolepsis (Reflection Sound Studio)
 1976: Rumors (Vanguard Records)
 1981: Lively (Moonlight Records)
 1980: Suddenly (Warner Bros.)
 2002: The 5'11" Record (Gaff Music)

Don Dixon and Marti Jones
 2008: Lucky Stars: New Lullabies for Old Souls (Lava Head Music)
 2011: Living Stereo (Dixon Archival Remnants Records)

Don Dixon & the Jump Rabbits
 2008: Nu-Look (Dixon Archival Remnants Records)

Performs on 
 1979: Mike Cross – Bounty Hunter (Sugar Hill Records)
 1983: Chris Stamey – It's a Wonderful Life (DB Records)
 1984: Beat Rodeo – Staying Out Late with…Beat Rodeo (I.R.S. Records)
 1985: Marti Jones – Unsophisticated Time (A&M Records) 
 1985: The Windbreakers – Terminal (Mark Records/Minotauro) 
 1985: Marti Jones – Match Game (A&M Records) 
 1986: Dumptruck – Positively Dumptruck (Enigima Records) 
 1986: The Golden Palominos – Blast of Silence (Charly Records)
 1986: Welcome to Comboland (Making Waves) 
 1986: The Smithereens – Especially for You (Enigma Records)
 1986: Mathew Sweet – Inside (Columbia Records)
 1987: Marshall Crenshaw – Mary Jean & 9 Others (Warner Bros.)
 1988: Marti Jones – Used Guitars (A&M Records)
 1989: Mike Cross – Prodigal Son (Sugar Hill Records)
 1990: Mary Chapin Carpenter – Shooting Straight in the Dark (Columbia)
 1990: Richard Barone – Primal Dream (Line Records)
 1990: Marti Jones – Any Kind of Lie (RCA Records)
 1991: Chris Stamey – Fireworks (Rhino Records)
 1993: Kim Carnes – Gypsy Honeymoon: Best of Kim Carnes (EMI)
 1993: Michael McDermott – Gethersmane (SBK Records)
 1994: Mary Chapin Carpenter – Stones in the Road (Columbia Records)
 1994: The Moody Brothers – Guitar Boogie (Lamon Records)
 1995: James McMurtry – Where'd You Hide the Body (Columbia/Sony)
 1996: Marti Jones – Live at Spirit Square (Sugar Hill Records)
 1996: Marti Jones – My Long Haired Life (Sugar Hill Records)
 2020: King Mackerel & The Blues Are Running (Sugar Hill Records)
 1997: Pat DiNizio – Songs and Sounds (Velvet Records)
 1998: Kyle Davis – Raising Heroes (N2K Encoded Music)
 1999: astroPuppees – Pet (High Tone Records)
 1999: Robert Crenshaw – Full-Length Stereo Recordings (Gadfly)
 1999: The Smithereens – God Save the Smithereens (Koch Records)
 2000: Mark Bryan – Thirty on the Rail (Atlantic Records)
 2000: Robert Crenshaw – Victory Songs (Gadfly)
 2000: Kyle Davis – Don't Tell the World (KIk Records)
 2000: Ruth Gerson – Fools & Kings (The Orchard)
 2000: Carrie Newcomer – The Age of Possibility (Rounder Records)
 2000: The Pinetops – Above Ground and Vertical (Soundproof/Monolyth)
 2001: The Orange Humble Band – Humblin' Across America (Half A Cow)
 2001: Red Clay Ramblers – Yonder (RCA)
 2002: Marti Jones – My Tidy Doily Dream (Dixon Archival Records)
 2003: Caitlyn Cary – I'm Staying Out (YEP Rock Records)
 2003: Robert Crenshaw – Dog Dreams (Gadfly)
 2003: Dottie Pearson – A House Made of Love (Grapevine)
 2004: Bill Lloyd – Back to Even (New Boss Sounds)
 2004: Carrie Newcomer – Bettie's Diner: The Best of Carrie Newcomer (Rounder Select)
 2004: Bishop Leonard Scott – Hymns for the Nations (Tyscot Records)
 2004: Chris Stamey – Travels in the South (Yep Roc/Orange)
 2005: astroPuppees – Sugar Beat (Manatee Records)
 2005: Jeffrey Dean Foster – Million Star Hotel (Angel Skull Records)
 2006: Michael Stanley – American Road (ItsAboutMusic)
 2006: Volatile Baby – Traveling Lights (SilverMeteor)
 2007: Angel and the Love Mongers – The Humanist Queen (Rock Snob)
 2007: The Nomads – Evolution (A&R Recording)
 2007: GB Leighton – Shake Them Ghosts (CC Entertainment / MTM Music)
 2007: Patrick Park – Everyone's in Everyone (Curb Appeal Records)
 2007: Carey Sims – Wheels
 2008: Bell & Cooper – Postcards Out of he Blue (Dogjaw)
 2008: Otis Gibbs – Grandpa Walked a Picketline (Wannamaker)
 2008: Robin Schaffer – Hillbilly Fever (New Rounder) 
 2008: Michael Stanley – The Soft Addictions (Its All About Music)
 2009: Rebecca Rippy – Telling Stories (DV)
 2010: Sid Selvidge – I Should Be Blue (Archer Records)
 2010: Kelley Ryan – Twist (CD Baby/Manatee Records)
 2012: A Fragile Tomorrow – Be Nice Be Careful (Piewillie)
 2013: The Del Shannon Tribute: Songwriter, vol. 1 (Rockbeat Records)
 2013: Michael Stanley – The Ride (Its About Music)
 2018: The Sounds of Summer, Vol. 1 (Beat)
 2019: Chris Stamey – New Songs for the 20th Century (Omnivore Recordings)
 2020: For the Record: A Tribute to John Wicks (Kool Kat Musik)
 2021:Yesterday's Tomorrow: Celebrating the Winston-Salem Sound (Omnivore Recordings)

Production credits

As producer

Additional credits

References

1950 births
Living people
Record producers from North Carolina
Record producers from South Carolina
Songwriters from North Carolina
Songwriters from South Carolina
Musicians from Charlotte, North Carolina
Guitarists from North Carolina
Guitarists from South Carolina
People from Lancaster, South Carolina
The Golden Palominos members
American male bass guitarists
20th-century American bass guitarists
20th-century American male musicians
American male songwriters
Albums produced by Don Dixon (musician)
University of North Carolina at Chapel Hill alumni